This is a list of awards and nominations received by The Boyz, a South Korean boy group formed by Cre.ker Entertainment. Their debut extended play The First, second extended play The Start and third extended play The Only, released in December 2017, April 2018 and November 2018, respectively, won the group several new artist awards between 2018 and 2019, including the 2nd Soribada Best K-Music Awards, the 3rd Asia Artist Awards and the 9th Gaon Chart Music Awards.

Awards and nominations

References

Awards
Lists of awards received by South Korean musician